Emman Abeleda  is a former Filipino actor, singer and dancer.

Career 

Abeleda practically grew up on screen, he first started appearing on films as early as 1996. As a child actor, he often portrayed son and younger brother roles.

On television, he first appeared as Jun-Jun Estrera in the soap opera Esperanza all the while appearing in the sitcom Kaya ni Mister, Kaya ni Misis—both shows started running from 1997 and ending respectively in 1999 and 2001.

From 1997 to 1999, Abeleda appeared in Flames: The Movie (Pangako), Haba Baba Doo, Puti Puti Poo and the Christmas film Puso ng Pasko. First earning his FAMAS Awards nomination in 1998 for Minsan Lamang Magmamahal.

In 2003, he would reprise his role as Jun-Jun, the son of Maricel Soriano and Cesar Montano's characters in Kaya ni Mister, Kaya ni Misis, in the sequel series Bida si Mister, Bida si Misis. In the same year, Abeleda started performing with Sergio Garcia, Mhyco Aquino, Rayver Cruz, John Wayne Sace and Mico Aytona. as a group. The group composed mostly of former child actors, would eventually be introduced as singing and dancing teen idol Anim-E the following year and were mainstays in the weekly variety show ASAP.

Filmography

Television

Film

Awards and nominations

Notes

References

External links
 

Living people
Star Magic personalities
1989 births